California's 40th congressional district is a congressional district in the U.S. state of California, encompassing Orange, San Bernardino, and Riverside counties. It was one of 18 districts that voted for Joe Biden in the 2020 presidential election while being won or held by a Republican in 2022.

The district includes Yorba Linda, Anaheim Hills, Orange, Chino Hills, Tustin, Mission Viejo, Aliso Viejo,  Rancho Santa Margarita, Laguna Hills, Laguna Woods, Villa Park, Lake Forest, the unincorporated communities of North Tustin and Coto de Caza, and parts of Brea and Corona.

Competitiveness

In statewide races

Composition

As of the 2020 redistricting, California's 40th congressional district is located in Southern California. It takes up the majority of northern and eastern Orange County, and parts of southwestern San Bernardino and western Riverside Counties.

Orange County is split between this district, the 38th district, the 45th district, the 46th district, the 47th district, and the 49th district. The 40th and 45th are partitioned by Orange Freeway, E Lambert Rd, Sunrise Rd, Foothill Ln, Wandering Ln, N Associated Rd, E Birch St, S Valencia Ave, La Plaza Dr, La Floresta Dr, La Crescenta Dr, Highway 90, 1053 E Imperial Highway-343 Tolbert St, Vesuvius Dr, Rose Dr, Wabash Ave, 6th St, Golden Ave, Carbon Canyon Creek, E Yorba Linda Blvd, Jefferson St, 1401 Zion Ave-N Van Buren St, Buena Vista Ave, 17225 Orange Blossom Ln-1480 E Howard Pl, 17511 Pine Cir-Orchard Dr, Mariposa Ave, Lakeview Ave, E Miraloma Ave, Fee-Ana St, Sierra Madre Cir, E Orangethorpe Ave, Burlington Northern Santa Fe Railroad, Kensington Ave, N Kraemer Blvd, Carbon Creek, and E La Jolla St.

The 40th and 46th are partitioned by E La Palma Ave, E Jackson Ave, E Frontera St, Santa Ana River, Riverside Freeway, Costa Mesa Freeway, N Tustin St, E Meats Ave, N Orange Olive Rd, Garden Grove Freeway, 16909 Donwest-16791 E Main St, E Chestnut Ave, 16282 E Main St-717 S Lyon St, E McFadden Ave, and Warner Ave.

The 40th, 47th, and 49th are partitioned by Barranca Parkway, Jamboree Rd, Warner Ave, Harvard Ave, Myford Rd, Highway 5, Loma Ridge Nature Preserve, Bee Canyon Access Rd, Portola Parkway, Highway 133, Highway 241, Bake Parkway, San Diego Freeway, Ridge Route Dr, Moulton Parkway, Santa Maria Ave, Via Vista, Alta Vis, Santa Vittoria Dr, Avenida del Sol, Punta Alta, Galle Azul, Bahia Blanca W, Laguna Coast Wilderness Park, Highway S18, Aliso & Wood Canyons, Alicia Parkway, Pacific Park Dr, San Joaquin Hills Trans Corridor, Cabot Rd, San Diego Freeway, Via Escolar, Arroyo Trabuco Creek, Oso Parkway, Thomas F Riley Wilderness Park, and Ronald W Casper’s Wilderness Park. The 40th district takes in the cities of Tustin, Yorba Linda, Lake Forest, Laguna Woods, Laguna Hills, Mission Viejo, Rancho Santa Margarita, and eastern Orange, as well as the census-designated place North Tustin.

San Bernardino County is split between this district and the 35th district. They are partitioned by Chino Valley Freeway, Eucalyptus Ave, Peyton Dr, Highway 142, Tupelo Ave, Hazelwood Dr, Pipeline Ave, Los Serranos Blvd, Country Club Dr, Soquel Canyon Parkway, Elinvar Dr, Sapphire Rd, Onyx Rd, Copper Rd, Slate Dr, Butterfield Ranch Rd, and Pine Ave. The 40th district takes in the city of Chino Hills.

Cities & CDP with 10,000 or more people
 Orange - 139,911
 Mission Viejo - 93,653
 Lake Forest - 85,858
 Chino Hills - 78,411
 Tustin - 75,540
 Yorba Linda - 68,336
 Aliso Viejo - 52,176
 Rancho Santa Margarita - 47,896
 Laguna Hills - 31,207
 North Tustin - 25,147
 Laguna Woods - 15,850

List of members representing the district

Election results

1972

1974

1976

1978

1980

1982

1984

1986

1988

1990

1992

1994

1996

1998

2000

2002

2004

2006

2008

2010

2012

2014

2016

2018

2020

2022

Historical district boundaries
The seat was originally one of five reapportioned to California after the 1970 U.S. Census, but its boundaries have shifted radically through successive redistricting efforts. At various times it has included parts of Orange and San Diego counties, and from 1993 to 2003 it covered eastern San Bernardino and Inyo counties. From 2003 to 2013 the district was based in Orange County. The district covered the cities in the northern part of the county, including Fullerton, Orange, Cypress, Stanton, and Buena Park.

See also
List of United States congressional districts

References

External links
GovTrack.us: California's 40th congressional district
RAND California Election Returns: District Definitions
California Voter Foundation map - CD40

40
Government of Los Angeles County, California
Government of Los Angeles
Eastside Los Angeles
South Los Angeles
Bell, California
Bell Gardens, California
Bellflower, California
Commerce, California
Downey, California
Huntington Park, California
Maywood, California
Paramount, California
Constituencies established in 1973
1973 establishments in California